Chakradhari is a 1954 Hindi film starring Nirupa Roy and Trilok Kapoor as lead pair. It was their second collaboration.

Plot
The film deals on the newly passed act of prohibition of polygamy in the new-born state of India in the 1950s.

Soundtrack

References

External links
 

Films scored by Avinash Vyas
1950s Hindi-language films
1954 films
Indian fantasy drama films
1950s fantasy drama films
Indian black-and-white films